is a V-Cinema tokusatsu series of films part of the Kamen Rider Ex-Aid franchise. It was released for a limited time in Japanese theaters on February 3, 2018, with each subsequent chapter of the trilogy released in two-week intervals. Each of the films' subtitles contains the name of the focused characters.

Taking place two years after Kamen Rider Ex-Aid the Movie: True Ending, the movies portray several scenes and elements that were never told in the television series, as well as establishing Kuroto Dan/Kamen Rider Genm as the major antagonist/"Last Boss".

The first installment, focuses on the characters of Hiiro Kagami/Kamen Rider Brave and Taiga Hanaya/Kamen Rider Snipe and was released on February 3, 2017 on theaters and March 28 on DVD and Blu-Ray. The second installment, focusing on Parad/Kamen Rider Para-DX and Poppy Pipopapo/Kamen Rider Poppy, was released on February 17, 2018 on theaters and April 11, 2018 on DVD and Blu-ray. It also features the debut of Kamen Rider Another Para-DX, who is portrayed as a counterpart to Parad himself. The third and final installment,  is the final installment that focused on Kuroto Dan/Kamen Rider Genm and Kiriya Kujo/Kamen Rider Lazer, was released on March 3, 2018 on theaters and April 25, 2018 on DVD and Blu-ray. It also features the debut of Kamen Rider Genm God Maximum Gamer Level Billion and Kamen Rider Lazer Level X.

Plot

Kamen Rider Brave & Snipe
The supposedly disappeared Saki Momose re-emerged alongside Lovrica Bugster, who manipulated her. Luke Kidman, an American who gains interest in Nico Saiba developed symptoms of Lovrica's Game Disease. As both Brave and Snipe try to handle their situations, Kuroto Dan begins scheming from the shadows.

Kamen Rider Para-DX with Poppy
Saiko Yaotome is a doctor dedicated to recovery treatments and orchestrate "Let's make Bugsters", a new training game created for the recovery of people that disappeared. The test run has Emu raising Parad and Saiko raising Poppy. The real Parad has been trapped and he faces his mysterious double, with the strength of the bond with Emu.

Kamen Rider Genm vs. Lazer
Using the God Maximum Mighty X, Kuroto Dan caused the entire world to fall into Zombie Chronicle. Kiriya has found the key to face the power that not even Muteki can overcome and after receiving a certain message from Masamune, he faces Genm.

Cast
Regular casts
: 
: 
: 
: 
: 
: 

Kamen Rider Brave & Snipe
: 
: 
: 
: 
Cake shop clerk: 
Researcher: 
: 
: 
: 

Kamen Rider Para-DX with Poppy
, : 
: 
: 
: 

Kamen Rider Genm vs. Lazer
Hiiro Kagami: Toshiki Seto
Taiga Hanaya: Ukyo Matsumoto
Parad: Shouma Kai
Nico Saiba: Reina Kurosaki
: 
Miwa's father: 
Newscaster: 
Researcher: Daisuke Wachi

Theme songs
"Fellow Soldier"
Lyrics: Takayuki Tazawa
Composition: Keiichi Miyako
Arrangement: Rayflower
Artist: Rayflower
The theme song of Kamen Rider Brave & Snipe.
"Real Heart"
Lyrics: Mio Aoyama, Kyasu Morizuki
Composition: ats-
Arrangement: Toru Watanabe, Takehito Shimizu
Artist: Ruka Matsuda
The theme song of Kamen Rider Para-DX with Poppy.
"Believer"
Lyrics & Composition: BOUNCEBACK
Arrangement: Takehito Shimizu, Toru Watanabe
Artist: Hiroyuki Takami
The theme song of Kamen Rider Genm vs. Lazer.

References

External links

2018 films
2010s Japanese-language films
2010s Kamen Rider films